David Henry Dodd (born 13 November 1981) is a former English cricketer.  Dodd was a right-handed batsman who bowled left-arm Seam bowling.  He was born in Manchester.

Dodd represented the Derbyshire Cricket Board in three List A matches.  These came against the Gloucestershire Cricket Board and Derbyshire in the 2000 NatWest Trophy and against Cambridgeshire in the 2001 Cheltenham & Gloucester Trophy.

References

External links
David Dodds at Cricinfo
David Dodds at CricketArchive

1981 births
Living people
Cricketers from Manchester
English cricketers
Derbyshire Cricket Board cricketers